Canarana is a municipality in the Brazilian state of Mato Grosso.

Transportation
The city is served by Canarana Airport.

References

Municipalities in Mato Grosso
Populated places established in 1975